Ezra Irving Wescott (1818 – 1865) was a member of the Wisconsin State Assembly.

Biography
Wescott was a school teacher in what would become Wiota, Wisconsin. He married Nancy Brown in November 1845 before eventually settling in Cadiz, Wisconsin. Wescott died in Minneapolis, Minnesota, where he had been receiving medical treatment.

His brothers, Jefferson and Walter, were also legislators and his father, John, was a local politician in New Glarus (town), Wisconsin.

Political career
Wescott was a member of the Assembly during the 1863 session. Additionally, he was Magistrate of York, Green County, Wisconsin, Register of Deeds of Cadiz and Treasurer of Green County, Wisconsin. He was a Republican.

References

1818 births
1865 deaths
People from Wiota, Wisconsin
People from York, Green County, Wisconsin
Republican Party members of the Wisconsin State Assembly
American magistrates
County treasurers in Wisconsin
Schoolteachers from Wisconsin
19th-century American politicians
19th-century American educators